The 5th Annual Nickelodeon Kids' Choice Awards was held on April 22, 1991. The show was hosted by Corin Nemec. The 1991 Kids' Choice Awards introduced the KCA Hall of Fame Award.

Winners and nominees
Below is a partial list of nominees and complete list of winners. Winners are listed first, in bold. Other nominees are in alphabetical order.

Movies

Television

Music

Sports

Special Recognitions

Hall of Fame
 Paula Abdul
 Arnold Schwarzenegger
 Michael Jordan

References

Nickelodeon Kids' Choice Awards
Kids' Choice Awards
Kids' Choice Awards